"Don't Call Me Angel" is a song by American singers Ariana Grande, Miley Cyrus, and Lana Del Rey. It was released on September 13, 2019, by Republic Records as the lead single from the soundtrack to the film Charlie's Angels, based on the television series of the same name created by Ivan Goff and Ben Roberts. The song reached number one in Greece, Hungary, Iceland, Lebanon, and Israel, as well as the top five in eleven other countries.

Background and composition
Grande, Cyrus, and Del Rey had collaborated on the theme song for the 2019 film Charlie's Angels. The song was written by Grande, Alma-Sofia Miettinen, Ilya Salmanzadeh, Del Rey, Max Martin, Cyrus and Savan Kotecha. "Don't Call Me Angel" is a pop and trap song with "lightly hip-hop-infused production".

Critical reception 
The song received a lukewarm reaction from critics. Vultures Craig Jenkins wrote that the single "blends styles that sound fine alone but struggle to jell together ... such is the vastness of the space between the singers present". Stacy Anderson of Pitchfork stated that the pop stars "meet at a lower creative common denominator than they've enjoyed lately" while adding that the song has "distinct flatness". Writing for NME, Rhian Daly claimed it was "definitely not the follow-up to Destiny's Child's own Charlie's Angels theme" and that the collaboration was "far less potent".

Commercial performance 
"Don't Call Me Angel" debuted at number 13 on the Billboard Hot 100 chart becoming Grande's 20th top 20 song, Cyrus' 14th, and Del Rey's third. The song also became Del Rey's highest-charting song since "Summertime Sadness", which reached number six in 2013; as well as Cyrus' highest since "Malibu", which peaked at number 10 in 2017. The track started at number two on the Digital Songs chart with 26,000 downloads sold within its first week, and number eleven on the Streaming Songs chart with 26.3 million streams. With 7.5 million airplay audience impressions, "Don't Call Me Angel" also debuted at number 33 on the Mainstream Top 40 following a complete tracking week.

Music video
The music video and the song were both released on September 13, 2019. It features the singers dressed up in black angel costumes and wearing wings on their backs. The ending featured Elizabeth Banks showcasing her role as Rebekah Bosley from the film. The video has since surpassed the 100 million view mark becoming Grande's first video since "7 Rings" to do so, Del Rey's first since "Lust for Life" and Cyrus' first since "Malibu".

Lyric video
A lyric video was released on September 16, 2019, which shows scenes from the film.

Live performance
"Don't Call Me Angel" was first performed live by Cyrus during her set on iHeartRadio Music Festival on September 21, 2019.

Credits and personnel
Credits adapted from Tidal:

 Ariana Grande – vocals, songwriting
 Miley Cyrus – vocals, songwriting
 Lana Del Rey – vocals, songwriting
 Ilya – production, songwriting, bass, drums, keyboards
 Max Martin – production, songwriting, bass, drums, keyboards
 Alma – songwriting
 Savan Kotecha – songwriting
 Daniel Changel – songwriting, samples
 Cory Bice – record engineering
 Jeremy Lertola – record engineering
 Sam Holland – record engineering
 John Hanes – mixing engineering
 Serban Ghenea – mixing

Charts

Weekly charts

Year-end charts

Certifications

Release history

References

2019 singles
2019 songs
Ariana Grande songs
Charlie's Angels (franchise)
Miley Cyrus songs
Lana Del Rey songs
Songs with feminist themes
Songs written for films
Songs written by Ariana Grande
Songs written by Miley Cyrus
Songs written by Lana Del Rey
Songs written by Ilya Salmanzadeh
Songs written by Alma (Finnish singer)
Song recordings produced by Ilya Salmanzadeh
Song recordings produced by Max Martin
Music videos directed by Hannah Lux Davis
Number-one singles in Iceland
Number-one singles in Israel
Number-one singles in Greece
Number-one singles in Hungary
Number-one singles in Scotland
Republic Records singles
Trap music songs